Pseudodysderina is a genus of spiders in the family Oonopidae. It was first described in 2013 by Platnick, Berniker & Bonaldo. , it contains 8 species, all found in South America.

Species

Pseudodysderina comprises the following species:
Pseudodysderina beni Platnick, Berniker & Bonaldo, 2013
Pseudodysderina desultrix (Keyserling, 1881)
Pseudodysderina dracula Platnick, Berniker & Bonaldo, 2013
Pseudodysderina hermani Platnick, Berniker & Bonaldo, 2013
Pseudodysderina manu Platnick, Berniker & Bonaldo, 2013
Pseudodysderina suiza Platnick, Berniker & Bonaldo, 2013
Pseudodysderina utinga Platnick, Berniker & Bonaldo, 2013
Pseudodysderina yungas Platnick, Berniker & Bonaldo, 2013

References

Oonopidae
Araneomorphae genera
Spiders of South America